Operation Spider (Операција Паук) were a series of military actions in northwestern Bosnia that began on November 1994 and continued until the summer of 1995. It was a combined effort of Republika Srpska and the Republic of Serb Krajina to recover the territory of the Autonomous Province of Western Bosnia (APZB), which was a key ally of the Serbs. Franko Simatović and Jovica Stanišić commanded the offensive. The Bosnian central government had previously overrun and seized the territory. The offensive ended in a Serb victory and the Autonomous Province of Western Bosnia remained in existence until the fall of its key ally, the Republic of Serbian Krajina, and the subsequent end of the war.

Background

The Army of the Republic of Bosnia and Herzegovina (ARBiH) 5th corps, under Bosnian general Atif Dudaković and Hamdija Abdić, conducted an offensive into the Autonomous Province of Western Bosnia on August 21, 1994, and completely overrun the entire province on August 22, 1994. During this offensive, around 40,000 Muslims loyal to Fikret Abdić fled to the Republic of Serbian Krajina. Fikret Abdić, the former president of the APZB, had already fled to Croatia (Republic of Serbian Krajina), where he stayed until his province was liberated and restored.

Prelude
On September 27, 1994, the Army of the Republic of Serbian Krajina (SVK) and the Army of Republika Srpska (VRS) attacked and invaded a small part of the Republic of Bosnia and Herzegovina, with Krajina attacking from the south and Republika Srpska from the southeast. On October 2, their forces met and continued invading, but made little progress on later days (such as October 7 and 11). Their goal was to capture Bihać and liberate the APZB.

The invading armies continued to advance and made steady progress until November 3, 1994, when the forces of the ARBiH 5th Corps stopped them and pushed them back. Three days later, on November 6, the 5th Corps almost cut off from the rest of the army but failed to do so. The 5th Corps advanced south, aiming to destroy Krajina's army and liberate the APZB. The 5th Corps force had pushed back the Serbs from the outskirts of Bihać to be below the village of Kulen Vakuf.

Timeline
As the VRS and the SVK were ready, the VRS were given the signal to begin the operation. The 1st Krajina Corps went to attack the village of Kulen Vakuf. Upon arrival, they met no resistance from the ARBiH, as the 5th Corps had just retreated from the village. The 1st Krajina Corps attacked the 5th Corps from the south, capturing the villages of Ćukovi, Lipa, Gorjevac, Lohovo, Ripač, Lohovska Brda, Golubac, Pritoka, Grabež, Račić, Grmuša, Drenovo Tijesno, and Ostrožnica. Reserve forces helped attack from the west and advanced to push out the 5th Corps, capturing the villages of Vedro Polje, Zegar, Sokolac, Mali Skočaj, Zavalje, Međudražje, Veliki Skočaj, and the mountain of Debeljaca.

In the west, the 15 Lika Corps attacked and captured the village of Bugar. From the north, the 21st Kordun Corps launched an offensive to liberate the town of Velika Kladuša and restore the APZB. They didn't make very much progress though, and only captured Velika Kladuša, Bosanska Bojna, and Šmrekovac, but were able to restore the APZB.

Aftermath
The aftermath of this operation left the 5th Corps still encircled by the APZB, the Republic of Serbian Krajina, and the Republika Srpska. This encirclement continued until Operation Storm, when the Republic of Serbian Krajina—a key ally to the APZB—was defeated in August 1995, marking a huge turning point for the Bosnian War and Croatian war of independence. The APZB had no strength to take on the Bosnians, and were completely overrun by the 5th Corps in just one day, with Velika Kladuša being taken when Operation Storm ended on August 7, 1995.

Operation Spider and Operation Storm left many towns forever destroyed and ruined, most of which were on the frontlines of the conflict. There are about 8 ruined tows in the area: 3 next to Bihać, 1–2 next to Velika Kladuša, and 2–3 in the middle of the area.

Footnotes

References

Conflicts in 1994
Military operations of the Bosnian War
December 1994 events in Europe
1994 in Bosnia and Herzegovina
Army of Republika Srpska